Carlo Crotti (born September 9, 1900) was an Italian professional football player.

His older brother Enrico Crotti also played football professionally. To distinguish them, Enrico was known as Crotti I and Carlo as Crotti II.

Honours
 Serie A champion: 1930/31.

1900 births
Year of death missing
Italian footballers
Serie A players
Novara F.C. players
Juventus F.C. players
A.S.D. HSL Derthona players
Association football forwards